

The Pottier P.50 Bouvreuil ("Bullfinch") was a single-seat, single-engine racing aircraft developed in France in the late 1970s and marketed for homebuilding. It was a low-wing cantilever monoplane of conventional design with an enclosed cockpit. The undercarriage was of tailwheel configuration, and the P.50 was designed from the outset to offer the builder the alternative of fixed or retractable main units. Construction throughout was of wood, except for the engine cowling and main wheel spats, which were fibreglass mouldings.

Variants
 P.50 - version with fixed undercarriage
 P.50R - version with retractable undercarriage

Specifications

Notes

References

 
 

1970s French sport aircraft
p.050
Homebuilt aircraft
Single-engined tractor aircraft
Low-wing aircraft
Aircraft first flown in 1979